Svetlana Yurevna Agapitova (born February 8, 1964) is a Russian human rights activist, social and political activist.

Born on February 8, 1964, in Leningrad. She graduated from the journalism faculty of Leningrad State University in 1986. In 2012 she received a degree in law, graduated from the Russian Academy of National Economy and Public Administration under the President of the Russian Federation.

In 1989 she became a founder of information and advertising agency IMA-PRESS. Since 1991, she worked in Petersburg – Channel 5. On Channel Russia 1 led program of family and childhood.

December 23, 2009 entered the office of the Ombudsman of the child in St. Petersburg. January 21, 2015 re-elected the Commissioner for Children's Rights in St. Petersburg.

On December 1, 2021, she was elected Commissioner for Human Rights in St. Petersburg, replacing Alexander Shishlov.

Married, four children.

She has been repeatedly accused by Russian Orthodox activists of promoting abortion, homosexuality and sodomy.

References

External links
 Светлана Юрьевна Агапитова. Биография 

1964 births
Living people
Ombudsmen in Russia
Russian human rights activists
Women human rights activists